Burnaston is a civil parish in the South Derbyshire district of Derbyshire, England. The parish contains six listed buildings that are recorded in the National Heritage List for England.  All the listed buildings are designated at Grade II, the lowest of the three grades, which is applied to "buildings of national importance and special interest".  In the parish is Pastures Hospital, and two buildings associated with it are listed, a chapel and a conservatory.  Otherwise, the parish is rural, the only significant settlement being the village of Burnaston.  The other listed buildings are a house, farmhouses and farm buildings.


Buildings

References

Citations

Sources

 

Lists of listed buildings in Derbyshire